The Airsport Song is a Czech ultralight aircraft, designed by Marek Ivanov and produced by Airsport of Zbraslavice.

Design and development
The aircraft was designed to comply with the LTF-L 120 kg, US FAR 103 Ultralight Vehicles and English SSDR categories. It features a cantilever low-wing, twin-booms, a single seat enclosed cockpit, fixed tricycle landing gear and a single engine in pusher configuration. The Song has been produced in both a twin–tail and inverted V-tail layout. In most configurations, the Song includes a Galaxy GRS 3/270 ballistic parachute rescue system.

The Song is made from composites. Standard engines available are the  Bailey V5 four-stroke and the  Verner JCV 360 four-stroke powerplant. 

Randall Fishman of Electric Aircraft Corporation produces an electric-powered version of the Song, the Electric Aircraft Corporation ElectraFlyer-ULS.

Specifications (Song SW-V)

References

External links

2000s Czech ultralight aircraft
Single-engined pusher aircraft
Airsport aircraft